is the 9th single by the Japanese idol girl group HKT48. It was released on February 15, 2017. The title song is used as the opening theme of the animated television series Kamiwaza Wanda. The choreographic center is performed by Rino Sashihara.

The single was number-one on the Oricon Singles Chart and was also number-one on the Billboard Japan Hot 100.

Unlike other singles, this song was not performed on AKB48 SHOW.

Track listing

Type-A

Type-B

Type-C

Theater Edition

Weekly charts

Further reading

Notes

References

External links
  

2017 singles
2017 songs
Japanese-language songs
HKT48 songs
Oricon Weekly number-one singles
Billboard Japan Hot 100 number-one singles
Songs with lyrics by Yasushi Akimoto